Harda railway station is a small railway station in Harda district, Madhya Pradesh. Its code is HD. It serves Harda city. The station consists of three platforms, all well sheltered. It has many facilities including water and sanitation.

2015 Accident
In August 2015, Lokmanya Tilak Terminus– Kamayani Express derailed near Harda, Madhya Pradesh, bogies fell into Machak river after flash floods dislodged a culvert near Machak river causing rail misalignment.

References

Railway stations in Harda district
Bhopal railway division